Lars Bastian Ridder Stabell (27 April 1798–13 January 1860) was a politician in Denmark–Norway.  He was born in Copenhagen, Denmark in 1798 to M.H. Stabell and his wife. He entered the military service in 1812 as a cadet.  By 1814, he was a Second Lieutenant in a regiment based in Akershus and he participated in the Swedish–Norwegian War in that year.  By 1817 he had left military service and became a student.  He graduated with a cand.jur. degree in 1822.

He worked as a civil servant in Rakkestad and in the Oslo area for a few years before being named to the post of County Governor of Nordlands amt in 1834.  He held the governorship until 1847.  During that time, in 1842, he was elected to the Norwegian Parliament representing Nordland county. He served only one term.  In 1847, he moved to Kragerø in southeastern Norway to be a civil servant again, this time working in a customs office.  He died on 13 January 1860 in Kragerø.

References

1798 births
1860 deaths
Members of the Storting
County governors of Norway
County governors of Nordland
Nordland politicians